Fred Irving Howard (born September 2, 1956) is a former American professional baseball pitcher with the Chicago White Sox of Major League Baseball. Howard was born in Portland, Maine and attended the University of Maine, where he played college baseball for the Maine Black Bears baseball team in 1975. He was drafted in the 6th round of the 1976 amateur draft by the White Sox and made he debut on May 26, . His final MLB game was September 6, 1979. During his lone MLB season, he appeared in 28 games, starting 6, and finished with a 1–5 record. His ERA was 3.57 over 68 innings.

He played in the minor league system of Chicago from 1976–1983, including with the GCL White Sox, Appleton Foxes, Iowa Oaks, Knoxville Sox, and Glens Falls White Sox.  He then attended the University of Missouri School of Medicine and became a general surgeon.  He practices in Lake Wales, Florida.

References

External links

Baseball Gauge
Retrosheet
Venezuelan Professional Baseball League

1956 births
Living people
American expatriate baseball players in Mexico
Appleton Foxes players
Baseball players from Maine
Chicago White Sox players
Diablos Rojos del México players
Glens Falls White Sox players
Gulf Coast White Sox players
Iowa Oaks players
Knoxville Sox players
Leones del Caracas players
American expatriate baseball players in Venezuela
Maine Black Bears baseball players
Major League Baseball pitchers
Mexican League baseball pitchers
Miami Dade College alumni
Sportspeople from Portland, Maine
University of Maine alumni